Rymer Omar Liriano (born June 20, 1991) is a Dominican professional baseball outfielder who is currently a free agent. He has played in Major League Baseball (MLB) for the San Diego Padres and Chicago White Sox.

Career

San Diego Padres
Liriano signed with the San Diego Padres as an international free agent in 2008, and spent the first two seasons on the Padres' rookie-class teams. He then spent the 2010 season primarily with the Eugene Emeralds and the Fort Wayne TinCaps.

Liriano played most of the 2011 season in level-A, batting .319 with 12 home runs and 65 stolen bases and was named Midwest League MVP. Liriano began the 2012 season with the Padres' High-A affiliate Lake Elsinore Storm in the California League and was named a midseason All Star.

Liriano was added to the Padres 40 man roster on November 18, 2011. Liriano was named by Baseball America as the 49th best prospect in baseball heading into the 2012 season. He was named to appear in the 2012 All-Star Futures Game.

Liriano was called up to the majors for the first time on August 11, 2014, and he played in 38 games his rookie season. On August 13, 2014, he hit his first career home run off Tyler Matzek.

Liriano spent the 2015 season with the El Paso Chihuahuas of the Class AAA Pacific Coast League. The Padres designated Liriano for assignment after the 2015 season.

Milwaukee Brewers
The Padres traded Liriano to the Milwaukee Brewers for Trevor Seidenberger on January 28, 2016.

Chicago White Sox
On October 28, 2016, Liriano was claimed off waivers by the Chicago White Sox.
On September 4, 2017 his first White Sox hit was a solo home run off Trevor Bauer of the Cleveland Indians.

Los Angeles Angels
Liriano signed a minor league contract with the Los Angeles Angels on December 12, 2017. He was released on July 9, 2018.

Milwaukee Brewers
On July 20, 2018, Liriano signed a minor league deal with the Milwaukee Brewers and he became a free agent after the season ended.

New York Mets
On January 3, 2019, Liriano signed a minor league deal with the New York Mets that included an invitation to spring training. He became a free agent following the 2019 season.

Seattle Mariners
On February 23, 2020, Liriano signed a minor league deal with the Seattle Mariners. He was released by the Mariners organization on May 27, 2020.

West Virginia Power
On April 5, 2021, Liriano signed with the West Virginia Power of the Atlantic League of Professional Baseball. He became a free agent following the season.

Staten Island FerryHawks
On March 24, 2022, Liriano signed with the Staten Island FerryHawks of the Atlantic League of Professional Baseball. In 21 games, he batted .157/.302/.229 with 1 home run and 10 RBIs.

Fargo-Moorhead RedHawks
On May 29, 2022, Liriano was traded to the Fargo-Moorhead RedHawks of the American Association in exchange for a player to be named later. He was released on September 12, 2022.

References

External links

1991 births
Living people
Arizona League Padres players
Charlotte Knights players
Chicago White Sox players
Colorado Springs Sky Sox players
Dominican Republic expatriate baseball players in the United States
Dominican Summer League Padres players
El Paso Chihuahuas players
Eugene Emeralds players
Fort Wayne TinCaps players
Lake Elsinore Storm players
Leones del Escogido players
Major League Baseball players from the Dominican Republic
Major League Baseball right fielders
Peoria Javelinas players
Salt Lake Bees players
San Antonio Missions players
San Diego Padres players
Sportspeople from Santo Domingo
Syracuse Mets players
Tigres del Licey players
Tomateros de Culiacán players
Dominican Republic expatriate baseball players in Mexico
Staten Island FerryHawks players